HMS Rother was a Palmer type River-class destroyer ordered by the Royal Navy under the 1902–1903 Naval Estimates.  Named after the River Rother, east of Sheffield, South Yorkshire in England, she was the first ship to carry this name in the Royal Navy.

Construction
She was laid down on 23 March 1903 at the Palmer's shipyard at Jarrow and launched on 5 January 1904.  She was completed in May 1905.  Her original armament was to be the same as the turtleback torpedo boat destroyers that preceded her.  In 1906 the Admiralty decided to upgrade the armament by landing the five 6-pounder naval guns and shipping three 12-pounder 8 hundredweight (cwt) guns.  Two would be mounted abeam at the forecastle break and the third gun would be mounted on the quarterdeck.

Pre-War
After commissioning she was assigned to the East Coast Destroyer Flotilla of the 1st Fleet and based at Harwich. On 27 April 1908 the Eastern Flotilla departed Harwich for live fire and night manoeuvres.  During these exercises the cruiser  rammed and sank the destroyer  then damaged the destroyer .

In January 1909 Rother completed a refit at Sheerness before rejoining the Eastern Flotilla at Harwich.  In April 1909 she was assigned to the 3rd Destroyer Flotilla on its formation at Harwich.  On 2 November 1909 the destroyer  collided with Rother near the Longsand lightvessel. Rother was repaired at Harwich by the depot ship . She remained part of the Flotilla until displaced by a Basilisk Class destroyer by May 1912.

Rother had her boilers retubed at Pembroke Dockyard in 1912, joining the 5th Destroyer Flotilla on completion of the refit. She was assigned to the 5th Destroyer Flotilla of the 2nd Fleet with a nucleus crew. On 30 August 1912 the Admiralty directed all destroyers were to be grouped into classes designated by letters, with the River-class becoming known officially as the E-Class. The class letters were painted on the hull below the bridge area and on one of the funnels.

A reorganisation of the Royal Navy's destroyer force took place in 1912, with older destroyers, no longer suitable for fleet use, being used to equip Patrol Flotillas. By March 1913, Rother was part of the 9th Destroyer Flotilla, a patrol flotilla based on the Nore.

World War I
The role of the patrol flotillas was to prevent enemy ships from carrying out minelaying or torpedo attacks in the approaches to ports on the East coast, and to prevent raids by enemy ships. Shortly before the commencement of hostilities, the 9th Flotilla was deployed to its war station on the in the northern part of East coast of England. While still a member of the 9th Flotilla in March 1915, by June that year she had transferred to the Local Defence Flotilla based at Portsmouth. In June 1916, Rother was part of a Portsmouth-based Escort Flotilla.

Rother remained part of the Portsmouth-based Escort Flotilla until August 1917, but was listed as part of the 7th Destroyer Flotilla, employed on convoy escort duties on the East coast of England, in September 1917. She remained employed on convoy duties of the East coast of Britain, and on 10 December 1917 left Lerwick in Shetland with sister ship  as escort of a convoy of ships for East coast ports. Rother remained part of the 7th Flotilla in January 1918, but by February that year had transferred to the Portsmouth-based 1st Destroyer Flotilla. She remained part of the 1st Flotilla at the end of the war.

Disposition
By May 1919 she was paid off and listed for sale.  On 23 June 1919 she was sold to Thos. W. Ward of Sheffield for breaking at Briton Ferry, Glamorgan in Wales. She was not awarded a Battle Honour for her service.

Pennant Numbers

References

Bibliography
 
 
 
 
 
 
 
 
 
 
 

 

River-class destroyers
1904 ships